The 2021–2022 Bikarkeppni kvenna, named VÍS bikarinn for sponsorship reasons, was the 48th edition of the Icelandic Women's Basketball Cup, won by Haukar against Breiðablik. The competition was managed by the Icelandic Basketball Association (KKÍ) and the cup final was played in Smárinn, Kópavogur, and broadcast live on RÚV. Helena Sverrisdóttir was named the Cup Finals MVP after turning in 19 points, 15 rebounds and 9 assists.

Participating teams
18 teams signed up for the Cup tournament.

Final four

Cup Finals MVP

References

External links
2021–2022 Tournament results

Women's Cup